3pm was a New Zealand children's show hosted by Suzy Cato. It screened on the independent station TV3 in 1992, and featured an oversized pumpkin, games, interviews, viewers' mail and cartoons. The show was produced by the television company Kids' TV Ltd.

3PM is also an acronym for Product-Project-Portfolio Management, or alternatively Project-Program-Portfolio Management.

List of programmes

Cartoons
Dinosaucers
Disney's Adventures of the Gummi Bears
DuckTales
He-Man and the Masters of the Universe
The New Adventures of Winnie the Pooh
Speed Racer
TaleSpin
Teenage Mutant Ninja Turtles
The Transformers
Voltron: Defender of the Universe
Widget the World Watcher

Live-action
Double Dare

External links

References

New Zealand children's television series
1990s New Zealand television series
1992 New Zealand television series debuts
1992 New Zealand television series endings
Three (TV channel) original programming